The National Blueberry Festival aka the South Haven Blueberry Festival is held in South Haven, Michigan every year in August. It is one of the longest-running blueberry festivals in the United States and began calling itself a national festival in 1969.

There are about nearly 50,000 people that attend every year. Today the South Haven Blueberry Festival has been around for  years. This event is major for the city of South Haven. It bring in a lot of business and helps the local economy. Even though this isn't the only festival that goes on downtown South Haven it's an important one for the local blueberry farmers.

Many events were reduced in 2020 because of the COVID-19 pandemic.

References

Festivals in Michigan
Tourist attractions in Van Buren County, Michigan
Food and drink festivals in the United States
Fruit festivals